Fairview is an unincorporated community in Wayne County, Tennessee, United States.

References

Unincorporated communities in Wayne County, Tennessee
Unincorporated communities in Tennessee